Renée Jones (born October 15, 1958) is a former American dramatic actress.  Jones is best known for playing Lexie Carver on NBC's long-running soap opera Days of Our Lives, a role she began in 1993.  She has been nominated five times for the NAACP Image Award for Outstanding Actress in a Daytime Drama Series for the role.

Life and career
Born into a large family of five siblings, Jones grew up in Georgia and New York and worked as a secretary before signing with the prestigious Ford Modeling agency at the age of 19 and eventually making her acting debut on the prime time series The White Shadow. Jones made her debut on Days of Our Lives in the early 1980s as Nikki Wade. She returned to the soap, taking on a new role, as Lexie Carver in February 1993.

In April 2012, Jones confirmed in an interview with TV Guide's Michael Logan that she would vacate the role of Lexie Carver after 20 years and would retire to a simpler life, revealing that she is not happy in acting.

Filmography

References

External links

1958 births
Actresses from Florida
African-American actresses
American film actresses
American television actresses
American soap opera actresses
Living people
People from Opa-locka, Florida
20th-century American actresses
21st-century American actresses
20th-century African-American women
20th-century African-American people
21st-century African-American women
21st-century African-American people